Orla O'Reilly (born 28 February 1990) is an Irish professional basketball player and a member of the Irish national basketball team.

College career
O'Reilly played college basketball for Binghamton University from 2008 to 2012.

Professional career
After graduating from college, O'Reilly played for BL Lokomotiva Karlovy Vary in the Czech Republic. Her season ended early however due to a meniscus injury to her knee.

In 2017, O'Reilly signed with Australian club Sunbury Jets.

In 2018, O'Reilly signed with KR of the Icelandic Úrvalsdeild kvenna where she averaged 19.2 points and 9.2 rebounds.

Personal life
O'Reilly's older brothers, Colin O'Reilly and Niall O'Reilly, both played professional basketball. Her twin sister, Sinead, was her teammate at Binghamton University.

References

External links
Eurobasket.com profile
Icelandic statistics at Icelandic Basketball Association
Australian statistics at sportstg.com

1990 births
Living people
Forwards (basketball)
KR women's basketball players
Ireland women's national basketball team players
Irish women's basketball players
Sportspeople from Cork (city)
Úrvalsdeild kvenna basketball players
Basketball players at the 2015 European Games
European Games competitors for Ireland